Cavertitz is a municipality in the district Nordsachsen, in Saxony, Germany.

References 

Nordsachsen